In mathematics, a positive harmonic function on the unit disc in the complex numbers is characterized  as the Poisson integral of a finite positive measure on the circle. This result, the Herglotz-Riesz representation theorem, was proved independently by Gustav Herglotz and Frigyes Riesz in 1911. It can be used to give a related formula and characterization for any holomorphic function on the unit disc with positive real part. Such functions had already been characterized in 1907 by Constantin Carathéodory in terms of the positive definiteness of their Taylor coefficients.

Herglotz-Riesz representation theorem for harmonic functions
A positive function f on the unit disk with f(0) = 1 is harmonic if and only if there is a probability measure μ on the unit circle such that

The formula clearly defines a positive harmonic function with f(0) = 1.

Conversely if f is positive and harmonic and rn increases to 1, define

Then

where

is a probability measure.

By a compactness argument (or equivalently in this case
Helly's selection theorem for Stieltjes integrals), a subsequence of these probability measures has a weak limit which is also a probability measure μ.

Since rn increases to 1, so that fn(z) tends to f(z), the Herglotz formula follows.

Herglotz-Riesz representation theorem for holomorphic functions
A holomorphic function f on the unit disk with f(0) = 1 has positive real part if and only if there is a probability measure μ on the unit circle such that

This follows from the previous theorem because:

 the Poisson kernel is the real part of the integrand above 
 the real part of a holomorphic function is harmonic and determines the holomorphic function up to addition of a scalar
 the above formula defines a holomorphic function, the real part of which is given by the previous theorem

Carathéodory's positivity criterion for holomorphic functions
Let

be a holomorphic function on the unit disk. Then f(z) has positive real part on the disk
if and only if

for any complex numbers λ0, λ1, ..., λN, where

 
for m > 0.

In fact from the Herglotz representation for n > 0

Hence

Conversely, setting λn = zn,

See also
Bochner's theorem

References

Harmonic analysis
Complex analysis
Harmonic functions